Jacoba Wijnands (28 June 1924 – 2 February 2019) was a Dutch gymnast. She competed in the women's artistic team all-around event at the 1948 Summer Olympics.

References

1924 births
2019 deaths
Dutch female artistic gymnasts
Olympic gymnasts of the Netherlands
Gymnasts at the 1948 Summer Olympics
Sportspeople from Rotterdam